The 2006–07 Skeleton World Cup is a multi race tournament over a season for skeleton. The season started on 27 November 2006 and ended on 25 February 2007. The World Cup is organised by the FIBT who also run world cups and championships in bobsleigh.

Calendar

Men

Women

Men's overall results

Individual

Nations

Women's overall results

Individual

Nations

References

2006 in skeleton
Skeleton World Cup, 2007
Skeleton World Cup